The Shagan ( - Şağan) is a river in the east of Kazakhstan and a tributary of the Irtysh.

Geography
The Shagan has its sources in the northwestern slopes of the Chingiztau, a subrange of the Kazakh Uplands. It heads mainly northwards along semi-desert areas all along its course. Finally it meets the left bank of the Irtysh  to the west of Semey, former Semipalatinsk, city. Its food is mainly snow and the river is under ice between November and April. It flows during the spring floods, from May to June. In the summer it dries up or breaks up into disconnected pools. Its main tributary is the Ashchysu from the right,

History
It is located in the area of the Semipalatinsk Test Site, which was used as the primary testing venue for the Soviet Union's nuclear weapons. The river flows along the eastern boundary of the test site and fills the "Atomic Lake" Lake Shagan (or Lake Balapan), a lake created by the Chagan nuclear test. The lake was formed at the confluence with the Ashchysu in January 1965.

See also
List of rivers of Kazakhstan

References

External links
Radioactive contamination of the Shagan River ecosystem
On the Soviet nuclear program

Rivers of Kazakhstan